Isametovo (İsämät) is a rural locality (a selo) and the administrative centre of Isametovsky Selsoviet, Ilishevsky District, Bashkortostan, Russia. The population was 728 as of 2010. There are 7 streets.

Geography 
Isametovo is located 18 km west of Verkhneyarkeyevo (the district's administrative centre) by road. Zyaylevo is the nearest rural locality.

References 

Rural localities in Ilishevsky District